Cossacks is a series of real-time strategy video games developed by Ukrainian video game developer GSC Game World for Microsoft Windows.

Games

Cossacks: European Wars (2001)

Cossacks II: Napoleonic Wars (2005)

Cossacks 3 (2016)

Reception

References

External links

 Cossacks Official website

Real-time strategy video games
Video game franchises introduced in 2001
Video games developed in Ukraine
Windows games